The Goya Award for Best Animated Film (Spanish: Premio Goya a la mejor película animada) is one of the Goya Awards, Spain's principal national film awards. The category was first presented at the fourth edition of the Goya Awards with the film Town Musicians of Bremen being the first winner of the award. The category was not presented from 1990 to 1993 and 1995 to 1996.

Significance
The films Chico and Rita (2010) and Klaus (2019) were also nominated for the Academy Award for Best Animated Feature with the latter winning the BAFTA Award for Best Animated Film. At the Annie Awards, Chico and Rita (2010) and Klaus (2019) were nominated for Best Animated Feature with the latter winning the category while Buñuel in the Labyrinth of the Turtles (2019) was nominated for Best Animated Feature – Independent. At the European Film Awards, Planet 51 (2009), Wrinkles (2011), Birdboy: The Forgotten Children (2016) and Klaus (2019) have received nominations for Best Animated Feature Film, while Chico and Rita (2010), Another Day of Life (2018) and Buñuel in the Labyrinth of the Turtles (2019) won the award.

In the list below the winner of the award for each year is shown first, followed by the other nominees.

Winners and nominees

1980s

1990s

2000s

2010s

2020s

See also
César Award for Best Animated Film
Academy Award for Best Animated Feature
BAFTA Award for Best Animated Film
European Film Award for Best Animated Film

References

External links
Official site
IMDb: Goya Awards

Animated films
Awards for best animated feature film
Awards established in 1989